"With a Little Love" is a song by English singer-songwriter Sam Brown, which was released in 1990 as the lead single from her second studio album April Moon. It was written by Margo Buchanan and Sam Brown, and produced by Pete Brown and Sam Brown. "With a Little Love" reached No. 44 on the UK Singles Chart and remained in the Top 100 for four weeks.

Critical reception
On its release, Music & Media picked "With a Little Love" as their "Single of the Week". They described the song as "easy-going and full of melodic charm", and added, "Although it breaks no new ground stylistically, the song is extremely seductive." Stephen Lamacq of New Musical Express praised the song as " a stout, likeable number with an ear-bending hook and a background hint of Cyndi Lauper".

Tim Jeffery of Record Mirror considered the song to be a "real disappointment". He commented, "Sam's rich and exquisitely sexy voice is wasted on this rather drippy, mid-tempo song that borders on MOR country." Jeffery believed the "very safe and radio-friendly" song would do well commercially, but added "it would be nice to see Sam stretching herself on something a little more gutsy". Brett Thomas of The Sydney Morning Herald felt that despite the "overwhelming indifference" to the song's release as a single, it "shouts 'hit record'".

Track listing
7" single
"With a Little Love" - 3:48
"Window People" - 5:28

12" and CD single
"With a Little Love" - 3:48
"Long Way Down" - 3:29
"Window People" - 5:28
"Dolly Mixture" - 3:20

Personnel

With a Little Love
 Sam Brown - vocals
 Pete Brown - guitar
 Paul Bangash - guitar, backing vocals
 Danny Schogger - piano
 Joe Brown - mandolin
 Guy Barker - piccolo trumpet
 Matthew Seligman - bass
 Richard Newman - drums
 Martin Ditcham - percussion
 Vicki Brown - backing vocals

Window People
 Sam Brown - vocals
 Pete Brown - guitar, backing vocals
 Paul Bangash - guitar
 Danny Schogger - keyboards, programming
 Richard Newman - drums
 Margo Buchanan - backing vocals

Long Way Down
 Sam Brown - vocals, organ
 Pete Brown -  guitar, backing vocals
 Paul Bangash - guitar
 Simeon Jones, Cameron Jenkins - saxophone
 Matthew Seligman - bass
 Richard Newman - drums
 Tina Warrilow, Sara Jones, Vicki Brown, Margo Buchanan - backing vocals

Dolly Mixture
 Sam Brown - vocals, organ
 Pete Brown - guitar, synthesiser, backing vocals
 Paul Bangash - guitar, backing vocals
 Ian Maidman - bass, backing vocals
 Richard Newman - drums, backing vocals
 Phil Saatchi - percussion, backing vocals

Production
 Pete Brown, Sam Brown - producers (all tracks)
 Julian Mendelsohn - mixing on "With a Little Love"
 Jock Loveband - engineer (all tracks)
 Pete Brown - additional engineering on "With a Little Love" and "Long Way Down", recording and mixing on "Window People"
 Robin Evans - engineer on "With a Little Love", recording and mixing on "Long Way Down" and "Dolly Mixture"
 James Monkman, Alan Barclay - engineers on "Window People"

Other
 Robert Ogilvie - photography
 Jeremy Pearce - design

Charts

References

1990 songs
1990 singles
Sam Brown (singer) songs
A&M Records singles
Songs written by Margo Buchanan
Songs written by Sam Brown (singer)